The first RMS Saxonia was a  passenger ship of the British Cunard Line. Between 1900 and 1925, Saxonia operated on North Atlantic and Mediterranean passenger routes, and she saw military service during World War I (1914–1918).

Saxonias sister ship was Ivernia.

Design

Around 1900, the Cunard Line faced tight competition from the British White Star Line and the German lines Norddeutscher Lloyd and Hamburg America (HAPAG). However, Norddeutscher Lloyds new liner  had taken the Blue Riband from them in 1897, while White Star was planning to place a new 17,000-grt liner, RMS Oceanic  into service.

Rather than attempting to fully regain prestige by spending the additional money necessary to order liners that were fast enough to win back the Blue Riband from Kaiser Wilhelm der Grosse or large enough to rival Oceanic in size, Cunard tried to maximize their profitability in order to remain solvent enough to fend off any takeover attempts. Thus, although the decision to order and launch Saxonia in 1898–1899 was taken well before J. P. Morgan’s efforts of 1900–1902, to put together the large combination of shipping lines that was officially designated IMM in October 1902, Saxonia, her sister Ivernia, and her "half-sister" Carpathia became both instruments and models through which Cunard was able to successfully compete with its larger rivals – most notably IMM’s lead company, White Star.

She had a long, black hull, a low, well-balanced superstructure, and four masts. Saxonia and Ivernia both had a single funnel which was 106 feet (32.3 m) tall, probably the tallest funnel ever installed on a passenger ship. Saxonia had a large cargo capacity, so much so that her passenger accommodations were smaller than most people expected for a liner of her size. Her four masts were intended to allow effective handling of larger amounts of cargo than was customary on a liner.

Constructed at the John Brown & Company shipyard at Clydebank, Scotland, Saxonia was launched on 16 December 1899. She completed fitting out in mid-May 1900.

Operational history

Early history

Saxonia departed Liverpool on her maiden voyage on 22 May 1900, bound for Boston, Massachusetts. She operated on the Liverpool–Boston route until 1909, when she shifted on an alternating basis between Boston and New York, and between Liverpool and the Adriatic ports of Fiume and Trieste.

World War I

When the United Kingdom entered World War I in August 1914, Saxonia was requisitioned for government service and taken off her Trieste-Boston route. She made a single voyage as a troopship, carrying troops from the 41st Battalion of the Canadian Expeditionary Force, arriving in England on 28 October 1914. In 1915 she was tied up in England on the River Thames as an accommodation ship for German prisoners of war. In March 1915, she resumed service as a troopship.

Later career

After the war ended in November 1918, Saxonia returned to commercial service, returning to the North Atlantic run on the route between Liverpool and New York City. On 17 April 1919, one of her propellers struck the United States Navy tug  while Freehold was assisting in docking her at New York. Freehold sank with the loss of one crew member killed, but soon was refloated and repaired.

Saxonia underwent a major refit at Tilbury in 1920. Her funnel was shortened to 90 feet (27.4 m) in height, her passenger accommodations were modified to allow her to carry 1,449 passengers – 471 in cabin class and 978 in third class – and her gross tonnage dropped to 14,197.

After her refit, Saxonia returned to the North Atlantic service, operating between London and New York City. An additional stop at Hamburg, Germany, was added later.

Disposal

In 1925, the aging and outdated Saxonia was sold to the Hendrik Ido Ambacht company in the Netherlands for scrapping. Her scrapping was completed before the end of the year.

Cunard next used the name Saxonia for the passenger liner RMS Saxonia, launched in 1954.

See also 
 Ocean liner
 Maritime history of the United Kingdom
 Transatlantic Crossing

Notes

References
 thegreatoceanliners.com Saxonia (I) 1900–1925
 Dictionary of American Naval Fighting Ships: Freehold

External links
Multiple interior images of Saxonia

Ships of the Cunard Line
Passenger ships of the United Kingdom
Ships built on the River Clyde
1899 ships
World War I merchant ships of the United Kingdom
Troop ships of the United Kingdom
Maritime incidents in 1919